The babygirl and the flowerpot (Vietnamese : Em bé và lọ hoa) is a 1970 Vietnamese animated film, directed by Nghiêm Dung.

Plot

Production

 Artist: Hữu Đức
 Animator: Dân Quốc, Đình Dũng, Bảo Quang, Vũ Tân Dân, Kiến Hiền, Sỹ Nhạc, Song An
 Decorating: Khắc Y
 Sound: Cao Huy
 Montager: Nguyễn Thị Tám
 Color printing by the Vietnamese Technology for Film Production Factory

Award
 Merit prize of Moskva International Film Festival, 1973.

References

Vietnamese animated films
1970 animated films
1970 films